State Route 111 (SR 111) is a state highway in the southwest part of the U.S. state of Georgia. The highway runs  from the Florida state line, southwest of Calvary northeast through Cairo and Meigs, glancing off the northwest corner of Riverside, and ending in Moultrie.

Route description

SR 111 begins at the Florida state line, where the roadway continues as Dorsey Calvary Road. It intersects with SR 93 in Cairo. There, the two routes form a concurrency to the north. Farther north, there are intersections with SR 38 Spur and US 84/SR 38. The two routes head north out of Cairo, and then turn northeast. There, the routes diverge with SR 111 heading toward Meigs. In Meigs, SR 111 intersects SR 3 ALT, and the two routes have a short concurrency northeast to US 19/SR 3/SR 300. Upon leaving Meigs, the route briefly runs along the Thomas-Mitchell county line. SR 11 crosses the southeast corner of Mitchell County, before entering Colquitt County. The route travels through rural parts of Colquitt County before entering Moultrie, where it intersects SR 37. The two routes form a brief concurrency that runs along the Moultrie-Riverside city line. Along this line, the two routes diverge. SR 111 arcs around the northern part of Moultrie before meeting its northern terminus, at an intersection with US 319 BUS/SR 33.

History

Major intersections

See also

References

External links

111
Transportation in Grady County, Georgia
Transportation in Thomas County, Georgia
Transportation in Mitchell County, Georgia
Transportation in Colquitt County, Georgia